Alexsandre Kuntelia is a rugby union tighthead prop, who plays for La Rochelle and Lelos internationally.

Career 
Kuntelia made two starts for Didi 10 side Lelo Saracens before being signed for French Top14 giants La Rochelle. He made his debut coming of the bench against Pau in the 21–38 loss.

International career 
He was selected for the Georgian u20 squad that took part in the Six Nations U20 Summer Series, scoring in Georgia's victory over Scotland U20. He made 4 appearances in total, including 3 starts scoring a total of 2 tries.

Kuntelia made his full international debut coming off the bench against Samoa, scoring in the 68th minute. He also came off the bench in the historic victory over Wales.

International tries

References 

2002 births
Living people
Rugby union players from Georgia (country)
Rugby union props
Stade Rochelais players
Georgia international rugby union players